Lordhowea is a genus of flowering plants in the groundsel tribe within the daisy family.  The only species, Lordhowea insularis, is endemic to Australia's Lord Howe Island in the Tasman Sea.

Lordhowea insularis is a tall, woody herb growing to 1–2 m in height with distinctive, deeply toothed leaves and clusters of yellow flowers.  It is found on basalt soils on open, sunny ridges, as well as in light-canopied forest.  Its seeds are wind-dispersed.

References

Monotypic Asteraceae genera
Endemic flora of Lord Howe Island
Senecioneae
Taxa named by George Bentham
Plants described in 1867